The Ignavibacteriales are an order of obligately anaerobic, non-photosynthetic bacteria that are closely related to the green sulfur bacteria.

Taxonomy
The currently accepted taxonomy is based on the List of Prokaryotic names with Standing in Nomenclature (LPSN) and National Center for Biotechnology Information (NCBI).

 Family Ignavibacteriaceae Iino et al. 2010
 Ignavibacterium Iino et al. 2010
 Ignavibacterium album Iino et al. 2010
 Family Melioribacteraceae Podosokorskaya et al. 2013
 Melioribacter Podosokorskaya et al. 2013
 Melioribacter roseus Podosokorskaya et al. 2013

See also
 List of bacteria genera
 List of bacterial orders

References

Bacteria orders